13 is the sixth studio album by American death metal band Six Feet Under. The album was released in 2005 on Metal Blade Records.

Track listing

Personnel
Six Feet Under
Chris Barnes – vocals
Steve Swanson – guitars 
Terry Butler – bass
Greg Gall – drums

Production
Produced by Chris Barnes
Engineered by Chris Carroll, Patrick Magee and Ryan Yanero
Mixed by Chris Carroll
Artwork
Photography by Joe Giron
Graphic design, layout and cover art by Meran Karanitant

References

2005 albums
Six Feet Under (band) albums
Metal Blade Records albums